In Buddhist art and culture, the Urna (more correctly ūrṇā or ūrṇākośa (Pāli uṇṇa), and known as  in Chinese) is a spiral or circular dot placed on the forehead of Buddhist images as an auspicious mark. It symbolizes a third eye, which in turn symbolizes vision into the divine world; a sort of ability to see past our mundane universe of suffering.

As set out in the Lakkhana Sutta or 'Discourse on Marks', the ūrṇā is the thirty-first physical characteristic of Buddha. It is generally thought to be a whorl of hair and be a mark or sign of the Buddha as a mahāpuruṣa or great being. The device is often seen on sculptures from the 2nd century CE.

Gallery

See also
 Bindi (decoration)
 Bindu (symbol)
 Yantra tattooing

References

Buddhist art
Buddhist symbols